David Homoláč (born 12 October 1973) is a Czech former football player. He played in the top flight of his country, making more than 200 appearances in the Gambrinus liga. He also played in the Slovak Super Liga.

References

External links
 
 Profile at SK Dynamo České Budějovice website

1973 births
Living people
Czech footballers
Czech First League players
Slovak Super Liga players
FC Hradec Králové players
ŠK Slovan Bratislava players
SK Dynamo České Budějovice players
Association football defenders